The 15th Pan American Games were held in Rio de Janeiro, Brazil from 13 July 2007 to 29 July 2007.

Medals

Gold

Men's 20 km Road Walk: Jefferson Pérez 
Men's 50 km Road Walk: Xavier Moreno

Men's Team Competition: Ecuador national football team

Women's – 58 kg: Alexandra Escobar 
Women's – 75 kg: Seledina Nieve

Silver

Men's 20 km Road Walk: Rolando Saquipay 
Women's 20 km Road Walk: Miriam Ramón

Men's – 66 kg: Roberto Ibáñez 
Women's + 78 kg: Carmen Chalá

Bronze

Men's 1500 metres: Byron Piedra 
 

Men's Middleweight (– 75 kg): Carlos Góngora 
Men's Light Heavyweight (– 81 kg): Julio Castillo 
Men's Heavyweight (– 91 kg): Jorge Quiñónez

Men's + 80 kg: Andrés Heredia 
Women's – 60 kg: Carmen Arias

Women's – 57 kg: Diana Villavicencio

Men's Individual Race: Jorge Bolaños

Men's – 69 kg: Ricardo Flores

Men's Greco-Roman – 55 kg: Ángel Lema

Results by event

Football

Men's Team Competition
Preliminary Round
Defeated  (3-2)
Defeated  (4-2)
Semi Finals
Defeated  (1-0)
Final
Defeated  (2-1) → Gold Medal
Team Roster
Maximo Banguera
Wilson Folleco
Deison Méndez
Roberto Castro
Jefferson Pinto
Hamilton Chasi
Jesús Alcivar
Jefferson Montero
Edmundo Zura
Alex Alcivar
Fabricio Guevara
Germán Vera
Carlos Delgado
Alex George
Eduardo Bone
Israel Chango
Fidel Martínez
Pablo Ochoa

Triathlon

Women's Competition
Paola Bonilla
 2:02:16.72 — 11th place
Elizabeth Bravo
 2:11:01.88 — 22nd place

See also
 Ecuador at the 2008 Summer Olympics

References
 Ecuadorian Olympic Committee
 Rio 2007 Official website

Nations at the 2007 Pan American Games
P
2007